Boris Olegovich Mironov (born 21 March 1972) is a Russian former professional ice hockey defenceman.  He is the younger brother of Dmitri Mironov.

Playing career
Mironov began his hockey career with five seasons playing for HC CSKA Moscow.  Selected in the second round of the 1992 NHL Entry Draft 27th overall, by the Winnipeg Jets, Mironov only played 65 games for the Jets in his rookie season before he was dealt to the Edmonton Oilers as part of a package that allowed Winnipeg to obtain fellow defenceman Dave Manson.  Despite a dip in his performance immediately after the trade, Mironov's play was good enough to be named to the NHL All-Rookie Team.  Mironov spent parts of six seasons as a top-two defenseman with the Oilers before being dealt to the Chicago Blackhawks.  During his time in Edmonton, the fans and media often referred to him as BoBo.

After being dealt to Chicago, Mironov's play tailed off.  Despite a good first season with the team, his offensive production got less and less with each season.  In 2003, he was traded to the New York Rangers where things did not improve much, eventually retiring after the 2003-04 season.

Mironov came out of retirement in 2006, suiting for Russian side Vityaz Chekhov.  He played one season with the team before retiring for good in 2007.

International play
Mironov is a two-time Olympian for the Russian national ice hockey team.  He won a silver medal in 1998 in Nagano, Japan where he played with his brother Dmitri.  He also won a bronze medal in 2002 in Salt Lake City, Utah.

Transactions
20 June 1992 - Winnipeg drafts Mironov
15 March 1994 - Winnipeg trades Mironov, along with Mats Lindgren and 1st (Jason Bonsignore) and 4th (Adam Copeland) round draft picks to Edmonton in exchange for Dave Manson and a 6th round draft pick (Chris Kibermanis)
20 March 1999 - Edmonton trades Mironov, along with Jonas Elofsson and Dean McAmmond to Chicago in exchange for Chad Kilger, Ethan Moreau, Daniel Cleary and Christian Laflamme
8 January 2003 - Chicago trades Mironov to the Rangers for a 4th round draft pick.

Career statistics

Regular season and playoffs

International

See also
Notable families in the NHL

External links

1972 births
Cape Breton Oilers players
Chicago Blackhawks players
Edmonton Oilers players
HC CSKA Moscow players
Ice hockey players at the 1998 Winter Olympics
Ice hockey players at the 2002 Winter Olympics
Krylya Sovetov Moscow players
Living people
New York Rangers players
Olympic bronze medalists for Russia
Olympic ice hockey players of Russia
Olympic silver medalists for Russia
Ice hockey people from Moscow
Russian ice hockey defencemen
HC Vityaz players
Winnipeg Jets (1979–1996) draft picks
Winnipeg Jets (1979–1996) players
Olympic medalists in ice hockey
Medalists at the 2002 Winter Olympics
Medalists at the 1998 Winter Olympics